Gerald William "Ged" Baldwin,  (January 18, 1907 – December 16, 1991) was a Canadian politician who was known as the "Father and Grandfather" of the Access to Information Act.

Life and career
Born in Palmerston, New Zealand, Baldwin was educated in Edmonton, Alberta and became a lawyer. He stood unsuccessfully for the Legislative Assembly of Alberta in the 1935 general election, as the Conservative candidate in the riding of Peace River.  During World War II, he served with the Canadian Army in Britain and Europe. .

He first ran for the House of Commons in 1957, as a Progressive Conservative in the riding of Peace River against Solon Low, the leader of the Social Credit Party of Canada.  He was defeated, but ran against Low again in the 1958 election and was successful. From 1962 to 1963, he was the Parliamentary Secretary to Prime Minister John Diefenbaker. From 1968 to 1973 and again from 1974 to 1976, he was the Official Opposition House Leader and Progressive Conservative Party House Leader.  He retired from Parliament in 1980.

In 1982, he received an honorary Doctor of Law degree from the University of Alberta.  In 1985, he was made an Officer of the Order of Canada.  The citation for his investiture reads in part: "His efforts have stimulated many others to take up the cause [of freedom of information], thus encouraging governments in many jurisdictions across Canada to adopt similar legislation."  He published his autobiography, Frontier Justice, in 1987.

Baldwin's wife Beulah is the sister of Wilbur Freeland, paternal grandfather of Chrystia Freeland.

References

External links 
 

1907 births
1991 deaths
Members of the House of Commons of Canada from Alberta
Officers of the Order of Canada
Progressive Conservative Party of Canada MPs
Canadian autobiographers
New Zealand emigrants to Canada